Rebecca Shocklee (born September 1, 1978, née Wilson), known professionally by her stage name Beckah Shae, is an American Christian-pop-worship singer-songwriter. She is signed to the independent record label Shae Shoc Records she co-owns with her husband and producer Jack Shocklee.

History

Shae received her first Dove Award nomination in 2011 in the category of Urban Recorded Song of the Year for "Life". She also appeared on Jonny Lang's Turn Around (A&M), TobyMac's "Funky Jesus Music", Tonight (ForeFront) and joined him onstage for a performance at the 2010 GMA Dove Awards. Shae co-wrote several songs and featured on the title-track of Montell Jordan's album, Shake Heaven (Victory World Music), and is currently featured on Byron "Mr. Talkbox" Chambers' EP Show Me the Way on the track "Everything Works Together". Shae also appears on the movie soundtrack I'm in Love with a Church Girl.

The single "#putyourloveglasseson" was released on April 12, 2011.

Philanthropy

Shae has traveled, promoting and working alongside ministries like Kids Alive International, an organization that rescues abandoned and orphaned children. After a visit to Kenya in 2010 with Kids Alive, she filmed the music video, "Imagine", from her album LIFE, expressing her desire to "see others open up their eyes to the need and make a difference by becoming involved in sponsorship, adoption and missions." In 2011 she traveled with The A21 Campaign to Greece and acted as a "walking billboard", with matching shirts and taped mouths, as part of an initiative to raise awareness of human trafficking. On July 28, 2011, Shae performed for an audience that included keynote speaker Bernice King, daughter of Martin Luther King Jr., at the Women and Girls Benefit Luncheon held on the campus of Lipscomb University in Nashville, to raise funds for Youth Life Learning Centers (a program of Youth Life Foundation of Tennessee).

Discography

Studio albums

 Butterfly (January 23, 2006)
 Joy (June 28, 2008)
 Life (June 15, 2010)
 Destiny (August 16, 2011)
 Scripture Snacks, Vol. 1 (December 13, 2011)
 Scripture Snacks Vol. 2 (December 4, 2012)
 Rest (September 4, 2012)
 Champion (May 6, 2014)
 Mighty (July 15, 2016)
 Scripture Snacks, Vol. 3 (October 25, 2017)

Christmas albums
 Emmanuel (November 23, 2010)
 Let It Snow (December 2, 2016)

Children's albums
 Scripture Snacks Kids, Fun Size, Vol. 1 (July 31, 2015)

Singles 

 
Shae has also had success in the Gospel Digital Songs on Billboard where her songs "Here In This Moment" and "Life" peaked at No.3.

Awards

GMA Dove Awards

References

External links
 
 
 

1978 births
Living people
20th-century American women singers
20th-century American singers
21st-century American women singers
21st-century American singers
American women pop singers
American women singer-songwriters
American performers of Christian music
Singer-songwriters from California
Performers of Christian electronic dance music